Crosses is the fourth studio album by the Belgian rock band Zornik, released on May 13, 2007 by Parlophone.

Track listing
"Lost and Found"
"Black Hope Shot Down"
"The Backseat"
"Sad She Said"
"All of This Revisited"
"Fed Up"
"Fear in America"
"Straight to the Bone"
"There She Goes"
"Go/No"
"Get Whatever You Want"
"I Will Never Be This Way"

2007 albums
Parlophone albums
Zornik albums